Abderazak El Khalouki is a French rugby league footballer who represented France in the 2000 World Cup.

Playing career
Of Moroccan descent, El Khalouki played for Paris Saint-Germain in the  Super League competition and also made his début for France in 1997 against South Africa.

Now playing for Toulouse Olympique, El Khalouki was selected in the French squad for the 2000 World Cup. He only played in one match at the tournament, despite being predicted to be the team's star player.

In 2001 he played for the Villeneuve Leopards and was selected in the French squad to play Great Britain.

References

Living people
French rugby league players
France national rugby league team players
1975 births
Paris Saint-Germain Rugby League players
Toulouse Olympique players
Villeneuve Leopards players
Villefranche XIII Aveyron players
Villefranche XIII Aveyron coaches
Rugby league props
French sportspeople of Moroccan descent
Place of birth missing (living people)